Riccardo Fissore (born 18 February 1980) is an Italian former footballer who last played for A.C. Delta Calcio Rovigo as a defender.

Club career

Early career 
Born in Carmagnola, Piedmont, Fissore started his career with Torino. In June 2000, Fissore was exchanged to Internazionale along with his teammate Franco Semioli for 500 million lire and 5.5 billion lire respectively (approx. €3.10 million in total) in co-ownership deals. As part of the deal, Fabio Galante went in the opposite direction and joined Torino for 5.1 billion lire (approx. €2.63 million). After a loan spell at U.S. Lecce, Fissore returned to Internazionale in January 2001. In June 2001 Torino bought back Fissore for 2 billion lire (approx. €1.03 million).

Vicenza 
Fissore then moved to Serie B side Vicenza, initially on loan, but the deal was later turned into a co-ownership deal in 2003, and in summer 2004 Vicenza bought all of the player's remaining registration rights from Torino by winning the blind auction bid. In January 2008, Fissore left for Atalanta on loan, in exchange with Antonino Bernardini.

Mantova 
In June 2008 Fissore (for €500,000) and Mattia Marchesetti (for €1 million) were exchanged with Mantova for Valerio Di Cesare (for €1 million) and Simone Calori (for €500,000). The 4 players signed a 3-year contract.

Lega Pro clubs
In summer 2010 Mantova went bankrupt. In August 2010 Fissore joined Spezia. On 31 August 2011 Fissore left for Pavia.

Italian football scandal
On 18 June 2012 Fissore was banned 3 years and 9 months due to involvement in 2011–12 Italian football scandal. In April 2013 the ban was reduced to 14 months after the appeal was partially accepted by Tribunale Nazionale di Arbitrato per lo Sport (TNAS) of CONI.

Return to Lega Pro
On 1 February 2014 Fissore joined Real Vicenza. The club also signed Mirko Stefani, who return to football also from ban.

On 21 July 2014 Fissore was signed by Pordenone in a one-year deal.

On 2 September 2015 Fissore was signed by Maceratese.

In October 2016 he was hired by Fondi. In January 2017 he moved to Pistoiese.

International career 
Fissore reached the final of the 1999 UEFA European Under-18 Championship with the Italy national under-19 football team, losing out to Portugal.

References

External links 
 AIC profile 
 FIGC National Team Archive 
 
 

Italian footballers
Italy youth international footballers
Italy under-21 international footballers
Torino F.C. players
S.S. Juve Stabia players
Inter Milan players
U.S. Lecce players
L.R. Vicenza players
Atalanta B.C. players
Mantova 1911 players
Spezia Calcio players
F.C. Pavia players
Pordenone Calcio players
Serie A players
Serie B players
Serie C players
Serie D players
Association football defenders
People from Carmagnola
1980 births
Living people
Real Vicenza V.S. players
S.S. Maceratese 1922 players
Mediterranean Games silver medalists for Italy
Mediterranean Games medalists in football
Competitors at the 2001 Mediterranean Games
Footballers from Piedmont
Sportspeople from the Metropolitan City of Turin